Psycho II is a 1982 novel by American writer Robert Bloch, a sequel to his 1959 novel Psycho. The novel was completed before the screenplay was written for the unrelated 1983 film Psycho II. According to Bloch, Universal Studios loathed the novel, which was intended to critique Hollywood splatter films. A different story was created for the film and Bloch was not invited to any screenings. Universal suggested that Bloch abandon his novel, which he declined and released anyway to good sales.

Plot summary
Norman Bates has spent the last two decades locked up in a mental asylum after the events in the first novel. His psychiatrist, Dr. Adam Claiborne, has spent the last two decades working with Norman and has hopes of one day becoming famous by curing him. His plans come crashing down after Norman strangles a visiting nun with her rosary beads, then steals her outfit and walks out. Norman gets in the van with the other visiting nun and kills her with a tire iron, then rapes her dead body. As he drives away, Norman spots a hitchhiker and picks him up with plans to kill him and use his body to fake his death.

Later that night, the police find the van on fire with the charred remains of the nun and an unidentified man presumed to be Norman. Since this happened at the same time as a massive car pile up, they are exhausting their resources trying to identify the victims to notify their next of kin and can not get around to positively identifying Norman's remains.

Meanwhile, across town, Sam and Lila Loomis are murdered by an assailant with a knife. Claiborne is convinced that Norman faked his death and proceeded to kill them, but the police are skeptical. As they are surveying the crime scene, they see a news article talking about a movie being made based on Norman's life. Claiborne is convinced that Norman is going to Hollywood to kill everybody involved in production, so he heads out there to stop him.

Fearing the worst, Claiborne gets a job as a technical consultant on the film to keep an eye on everything. He gets introduced to the cast and crew, including director Vizzini, who is the spitting image of Norman twenty years previously. Claiborne keeps thinking that something bad is going to happen, but nobody believes him until the movie's producer gets killed with a meat cleaver. 

At the scene of the crime, Claiborne and screenwriter Ames find out about Vizzini's past: his mother was raped and murdered when he was a child. Meanwhile, Vizzini calls the actress playing Marion Crane to the movie studio where the shower scene is going to be shot under the guise of rehearsing the scene, but he is really planning on raping and murdering her. It turns out that his childhood trauma has affected his sexual morality.

Claiborne gets a bad feeling about Vizzini and heads over to the movie studio to try to stop him. Moments after he leaves, the phone rings and Ames answers it only to be in touch with the officer investigating Norman's disappearance. They have conclusively identified the charred remains in the van as Norman's. It turns out while Norman planned on killing the hitchhiker to fake his death, the hitchhiker actually overpowered Norman and killed him in self-defense. He had a criminal record and was worried about going back to jail, so he burned the van to hide the evidence and went into hiding. However, the hitchhiker really thought he was killing a nun instead of a disguised Norman. The thought of killing a nun weighed on his conscience and he eventually turned himself in. Ames concludes that if Norman is dead, Vizzini must be the murderer and he requests officers to go to the movie studio.

Meanwhile, Vizzini tries to rape the actress. However, she fights him off and kicks him hard enough to send him into the prop shower behind the curtain. Vizzini screams loudly and emerges with a large stab wound before dropping dead. The assailant then takes the knife and approaches the actress. However, before he can stab her, the police show up and shoot him. As he falls, he is revealed to be none other than Dr. Claiborne. He survives the shooting and ends up committed to the very asylum that Norman spent twenty years in. 

Claiborne's colleague deduces that he put so much time and energy into Norman Bates, that when Norman died, Claiborne realized he would never get the fame he wished for and the trauma of this reality gave him Norman's split personality. This split personality killed Sam and Lila, Vizzini, and the producer. Now, his colleague is hoping that he will one day be cured, but he is not very optimistic.

Reception
Dave Pringle reviewed Psycho II for Imagine magazine, and stated that "Psycho 2 is in the same genre as Red Dragon (psychological/murder/horror), but it is much cruder and much less believable".

Reviews
 Review by Debbie Notkin (1982) in Locus, #261 October 1982
 Review by David Sherman (1982) in Fangoria, November 1982
 Review by Gene DeWeese (1982) in Science Fiction Review, Winter 1982
 Review by Michael E. Stamm (1982) in Science Fiction & Fantasy Book Review, #10, December 1982
 Review by Bob Collins (1982) in Fantasy Newsletter, #54 December 1982
 Review by Chris Henderson (1982) in Dragon Magazine, December 1982
 Review by Robert M. Price (1983) in Crypt of Cthulhu, #15 Lammas 1983
 Review by Joe Sanders (1983) in Starship, Winter 1983-84
 Review by John Gregory Betancourt (1988) in Weird Tales, Summer 1988

References

1982 American novels
American thriller novels
American horror novels
Sequel novels
Novels by Robert Bloch
Novels about serial killers
Dissociative identity disorder in popular culture
Novels about necrophilia
Psycho (franchise)